The Diocese of Dallas is a Latin Church ecclesiastical jurisdiction or diocese of the Catholic Church in Texas. It was founded on July 15, 1890, by Pope Leo XIII. The diocese's cathedral is the Cathedral Shrine of the Virgin of Guadalupe. As of May 2008, the diocese had more than one million Catholics in 80 parishes served by 208 priests, 160 deacons, 142 sisters, and seven brothers. Its territory comprises nine counties in North Texas: Collin, Dallas, Ellis, Fannin, Grayson, Hunt, Kaufman, Navarro, and Rockwall. The diocese is a suffragan diocese of the Archdiocese of San Antonio. On December 13, 2016, Pope Francis nominated Juneau Bishop Edward J. Burns to serve as the new bishop of the Diocese of Dallas.

History
The Catholic history of Dallas began long before the formal creation of the diocese. The city of Dallas was settled by people from Kentucky, Illinois, and Indiana, as well as foreign immigrants and African-Americans. The Catholic population, however, was not considerable: as late as 1868 there was only one Catholic family living in the area. The members of this family were ministered to by priests from an Irish Catholic settlement, St. Paul, in Collin County. A certain Father Joseph Martinere, later a domestic prelate and vicar general of the diocese, often made journeys of over hundreds of miles through swamp and forest to reach the area.

The diocese was erected on July 15, 1890, out of the northern and northwestern portions of the Diocese of Galveston. Its first bishop was Thomas Francis Brennan, an Irishman who served in the diocese for two years before being removed to Rome. By 1892 the Catholic population of the diocese had grown to 15,000, and there were 30 priests. Catholicism in the area continued to grow because of immigration, as Catholics came to the area from the northern states, and by 1908 there were 83 priests serving an estimated Catholic population of 60,000.

The diocese's second bishop, Edward Dunne, was an Irish immigrant to the United States. He was bishop from 1894 until his death in 1910. It was under his episcopacy that the diocese constructed its cathedral, which the 1908 Catholic Encyclopedia called "admittedly the finest in the South-Western States". Dunne also opened several educational institutions, including Holy Trinity College (later renamed the University of Dallas). He established St. Paul Sanitarium (later known as St. Paul Medical Center before being demolished) in Dallas and St. Anthony's Sanitarium, which was the first hospital in Amarillo. During his sixteen years as bishop, the number of churches increased from twenty-eight to ninety, and the Catholic population tripled in size.

Joseph Lynch was the third bishop of the diocese. His 43 years, from 1911 to 1954, as bishop comprise the longest term of any bishop in the United States. Though Bishop Lynch's episcopal career saw the foundation of 108 Catholic parishes, it also saw the Diocese of Dallas lose territory with the creation of the Dioceses of El Paso, Amarillo, and Austin. On October 20, 1953 the name of the diocese was changed to the Diocese of Dallas–Fort Worth. The diocese would return to its former name with the creation of the Diocese of Fort Worth on August 9, 1969.

The episcopal career of Thomas Gorman (1954–1969) saw the revival of the Texas Catholic newspaper, which had been suspended since 1894. There were twenty-five parochial schools constructed in his fifteen years as bishop, as well as twenty new parishes. The following period of the next bishop, Thomas Tschoepe, saw the diocese lose territory to the Diocese of Tyler in 1989, but further growth was marked under the next bishop, Charles Victor Grahmann, as the Catholic population of the diocese expanded from 200,000 to nearly a million between 1990 and 2007. The Diocese of Dallas was not untouched by the scandal of Catholic sex abuse cases, as a jury awarded $120 million from the diocese to victims in a 1997 case implicating Rudy Kos, a priest of the diocese who has since been laicised.

The next bishop of Dallas was Kevin Farrell, who was appointed on March 6, 2007, and installed on May 1, 2007. In 2010, Pope Benedict XVI named J. Douglas Deshotel and Mark J. Seitz as auxiliary bishops of the Diocese of Dallas. They were consecrated on April 27, 2010, by Bishop Farrell, who was assisted by Bishop Emeritus Charles Grahmann and Michael Duca, Bishop of Shreveport. Deshotel later became the Bishop of Lafayette in Louisiana while Seitz became the Bishop of El Paso. Gregory Kelly became the next auxiliary bishop in 2016. Later in 2016, Bishop Farrell was named the Prefect of the Dicastery for the Laity, Family and Life. His move to the Vatican left the diocese without a bishop until Pope Francis named Diocese of Juneau Bishop Edward J. Burns as the new bishop.

In April 2020, it was revealed that Oscar Mora, a Colombian priest accused of abuse who was suspended from the his native nation's Catholic Archdiocese of Villavicencio, had taken up ministry in the Diocese of Dallas. The Diocese of Dallas removed Mora from ministry after being informed by the Archdiocese of Villavicencio about the allegations against him.

Bishops

The lists of bishops, coadjutor bishops, and auxiliary bishops and their terms of service, followed by other priests of this diocese who became bishops:

Bishops of Dallas
 Thomas Francis Brennan (1890–1892)
 Edward Joseph Dunne (1893–1910)
 Joseph Patrick Lynch (1911–1954)
 Thomas Kiely Gorman (1954–1969)
 Thomas Ambrose Tschoepe (1969–1990)
 Charles Victor Grahmann (1990–2007)
 Kevin Farrell (2007–2016), appointed Prefect of the Dicastery for the Laity, Family and Life (elevated to Cardinal in 2016)
 Edward James Burns (2017–present)

Coadjutor Bishops
 Thomas Kiely Gorman (1952–1954)
 Charles Victor Grahmann (1989–1990)
 Joseph Anthony Galante (1999–2004), did not succeed to the see; appointed Bishop of Camden

Auxiliary Bishops
 Augustine Danglmayr (1942–1969)
 John Joseph Cassata (1968–1969), appointed Bishop of Fort Worth
 Mark J. Seitz (2010–2013), appointed Bishop of El Paso
 J. Douglas Deshotel (2010–2016), appointed Bishop of Lafayette
 John Gregory Kelly (2016–present)

Other priests of this diocese who became Bishops
 Rudolph Aloysius Gerken, appointed Bishop of Amarillo in 1926 and later Archbishop of Santa Fe
 Wendelin Joseph Nold, appointed Coadjutor Bishop (in 1947) and later Bishop of Galveston-Houston
 Lawrence Michael De Falco, appointed Bishop of Amarillo in 1963
 Michael Jarboe Sheehan, appointed Bishop of Lubbock in 1983
 David Eugene Fellhauer, appointed Bishop of Victoria in 1990
 Michael Gerard Duca, appointed Bishop of Shreveport in 2008 and later Bishop of Baton Rouge
 Joseph Edward Strickland (priest here, 1985–1987), appointed Bishop of Tyler in 2012
 Robert Milner Coerver, appointed Bishop of Lubbock in 2016

Coat of arms
The diocese's coat of arms has a red field in honor of the Sacred Heart of Jesus, which is the diocese's patronal feast. The diagonal white band represents the Trinity River located within the diocese (the placement of the band, from top left to bottom right, somewhat resembles the northwest–southeast direction the river takes through the state). The fleurs-de-lis within the band are in honor of Pope Leo XIII (who was Pope when the diocese was established) and are taken from his coat of arms. The fleur-de-lis is repeated three times to represent the Holy Trinity. The solitary star represents Dallas and also pays tribute to Texas' nickname, "The Lone Star State". The two swords honor St. Paul, who is the patron saint of the first Catholic settlement in Northeast Texas.

The formal heraldic blazon for the coat of arms is: Gules, on a fess per bend wavy argent three fleurs-de-lis azure; in the sinister chief two crossed swords argent, in the dexter base a molet argent.

Education

 Seminaries
 Holy Trinity Seminary, Irving
 Redemptorist Mater Seminary, Dallas

 Universities
 Newman Catholic Ministry University of Texas at Dallas
 SMU Catholic Campus Ministry Southern Methodist University
 Catholic Student Organization Texas A&M University-Commerce
 University of Dallas Campus Ministry University of Dallas
 Catholic Student Organization Austin College

 High schools
 Bishop Dunne Catholic School, Dallas
 Bishop Lynch High School, Dallas
John Paul II High School, Plano
 Notre Dame School of Dallas (Special Education), Dallas
 Independent Catholic high schools and schools with high school sections
 Cistercian Preparatory School
 Cristo Rey Dallas College Prep
 Dallas Jesuit High School
 The Highlands School
 Ursuline Academy of Dallas

See also

 Catholic Church by country
 Catholic Church in the United States
 Ecclesiastical Province of San Antonio
 Global organisation of the Catholic Church
 List of Roman Catholic archdioceses (by country and continent)
 List of Roman Catholic dioceses (alphabetical) (including archdioceses)
 List of Roman Catholic dioceses (structured view) (including archdioceses)
 List of the Catholic dioceses of the United States

References

External links
 Roman Catholic Diocese of Dallas Official Site
 Roman Catholic Diocese of Dallas Schools
 The Texas Catholic - diocesan newspaper

Roman Catholic Ecclesiastical Province of San Antonio
Religion in Dallas
Religious organizations established in 1890
Dallas
Dallas
1890 establishments in Texas